Mong Hsat Township is a township of Mong Hsat District in the Shan State of Myanmar. The capital town is Mong Hsat.

See also
Saharat Thai Doem

References

Mongsat District
Townships of Shan State